The Blaustein Building is a highrise building located in Baltimore, Maryland, United States. The building was constructed in 1962, and was developed by Vincent Kling & Associates. The Hub Department Store was destroyed in order for this building to be built. The Blaustein Building was constructed for the Blaustein, to move into a larger headquarters. Corinthian Realty Partners LLC of Bethesda acquired the firm for the building in 2005 for US$10 million.

See also
List of tallest buildings in Baltimore

References

External links
Blaustein Building drawings

Downtown Baltimore
Office buildings completed in 1962
Skyscraper office buildings in Baltimore